Spotswood railway station is located on the Werribee and Williamstown lines in Victoria, Australia. It serves the western Melbourne suburb of Spotswood, and opened on 1 December 1878 as Edom. It was renamed Bayswater on 1 September 1881, renamed Spottiswoode on 1 October 1881, and renamed Spotswood on 1 August 1905.

History

Spotswood station opened on 1 December 1878 and, like the suburb itself, was named after John Stewart Spottiswoode, a local resident who purchased land in the area in 1841.

Over the years, a number of sidings were provided to businesses in the area. In 1914, a branch line was opened at the down end of the station to the Newport Power Station, in addition to a number of other sidings serving oil terminals in the area. A siding at the up end of the station served the Australian Glass Manufacturers factory, and was used by sand trains from Koala Siding (near Nyora on the South Gippsland line). On 15 January 1998, the last sand train operated.

In 1972, both platforms received extensions. In 1988, a number of points and dwarf signals at the station were abolished. In 1989, boom barriers replaced interlocked gates at the Hudson Road level crossing, located at the up end of the station.

In 1994, a number of alterations occurred at the station, including the removal of a crossover at the down end, as well as the overhead wire for siding "K", the connections for siding "K" and the oil sidings, and a number of points and signals.

A disused signal box is at the up end of Platform 1. It was decommissioned in 2001, along with the removal of the crossover at the up end, a number of dwarf signals and a siding. In 2007, the remains of some sidings that ran along public roads in the area were removed by Hobsons Bay Council.

On 26 October 2022, the Level Crossing Removal Project announced that the level crossing will be grade separated by 2030, with the railway line likely to be rebuilt over the road, and will include a rebuilt station.

Platforms and services

Spotswood has two side platforms. It is served by Werribee and Williamstown trains.

Platform 1:
  all stations services to Flinders Street and Frankston
  all stations services to Flinders Street and Frankston

Platform 2:
  all stations services to Laverton via Altona (weekdays only); all stations services to Werribee
  all stations services to Williamstown

Gallery

References

External links
 Melway map at street-directory.com.au

Railway stations in Melbourne
Railway stations in Australia opened in 1878
Railway stations in the City of Hobsons Bay